

Bangladesh

State owned

Privately owned

Mixed entertainment

News

Music

Kids

Sports

Infotainment

Defunct

Canada

India

State owned

West Bengal

News

Entertainment

Cinema

Music

Sports

Tripura

Defunct

United Kingdom
ATN Bangla
Bangla TV
Channel S

See also
List of Bangladeshi television and radio channels

References

External links
Bangladeshi TV channels Full List
Bangladeshi TV Channels

Television stations
Television channelsls by language
Television channels
Lists of television channels in India
Bangladeshi television-related lists
Indian television-related lists
Bengali television-related lists